West Bend may refer to the following:

Places

Canada
West Bend, Saskatchewan

United States
West Bend, Iowa
West Bend, Missouri
West Bend, Wisconsin
 West Bend Municipal Airport
 West Bend School District, Wisconsin
West Bend (town), Wisconsin

Companies
West Bend Company